Staryye Balykly (İśke Balıqlı) is a rural locality (a selo) in Akhmanovsky Selsoviet, Bakalinsky District, Bashkortostan, Russia. The population was 489 as of 2010. There are 4 streets.

Geography 
Staryye Balykly is located 8 km southwest of Bakaly (the district's administrative centre) by road. Akhmanovo is the nearest rural locality.

References 

Rural localities in Bakalinsky District